Kwong Wah may mean or refer to:

 Kwong Wa, a Hong Kong actor
 Kwong Wah Yit Poh, a Malaysian Chinese newspaper
 Kwong Wah Hospital, Hong Kong hospital
 Lau Kong Wah, a legislative councilor
 Kwong Wah Athletic Association, a football team competing in the Hong Kong Third Division League

See also
 Guang Hua Digital Plaza, an indoor six-story market